Henry Joseph Walker (November 28, 1849 in Hillier Township, Canada West – March 21, 1918) was a Canadian politician and merchant. He was elected in 1911 to the House of Commons of Canada as a Member of the historical Conservative Party for the riding of Northumberland East. Prior to his federal political experience, he was reeve and councilor of Percy Township, Ontario.

External links 
 

1849 births
1918 deaths
Conservative Party of Canada (1867–1942) MPs
Members of the House of Commons of Canada from Ontario